Jonathan Richard Partington (born 4 February 1955) is an English mathematician who is Emeritus Professor of pure mathematics at the University of Leeds.

Education
Professor Partington was educated at Gresham's School, Holt, and Trinity College, Cambridge, where he completed his PhD thesis entitled "Numerical ranges and the Geometry of Banach Spaces" under the supervision of Béla Bollobás.

Career
Partington works in the area of functional analysis, sometimes applied to control theory, and is the author of several books in this area.  He was formerly editor-in-chief of the Journal of the London Mathematical Society, a position he held jointly with his Leeds colleague John Truss.

Partington's extra-mathematical activities include the invention of the March March march, an annual walk starting at March, Cambridgeshire. He is also known as a writer or co-writer of some of the earliest British text-based computer games, including Acheton, Hamil, Murdac, Avon, Fyleet, Crobe, Sangraal, and SpySnatcher, which started life on the Phoenix computer system at the University of Cambridge Computer Laboratory.

Books

External links
Professor Jonathan R. Partington at the University of Leeds

1955 births
Living people
People from Holt, Norfolk
20th-century English mathematicians
21st-century English mathematicians
Mathematical analysts
People educated at Gresham's School
Alumni of Trinity College, Cambridge
Fellows of Pembroke College, Cambridge
Fellows of Fitzwilliam College, Cambridge
Academics of the University of Leeds